Park kultúry a oddychu abbreviated PKO and in the past commonly referred to as Pekáč was a complex of buildings in Bratislava, Slovakia on the Bratislava Riverfront by the Danube, built in 1954 and demolished in 2016. Until 2010, the complex was a major place for cultural events in the capital city featuring musical concerts, TV show tapings, balls, high school proms and dance class graduations. In 2010 Park kultúry a oddychu became the focus of a public scandal concerning the signing of some contracts in secret by the then-Mayor of Bratislava Andrej Ďurkovský resulting in the public learning about the building being demolished in the future.

The buildings contained many artworks both inside and from the outside. The entrance hall contained 28 stained glass windows by national artist Janko Alexy, the floor in the hall was made from unique colored marble from near Lučenec, the first floor above contained a monumental painting Dožinky by academic painter František Gajdoš. The outside of the main building was decorated with two statues by sculptor Tibor Bártfay, above them was a sgraffito decoration.

Park kultúry a oddychu also contained an astronomy section where regular astronomy lectures and nightsky observations were being held. This institution was a lone representative of its kind in the city, uniquely among European capitals, Bratislava lacks both an observatory and a planetarium. Demolition of Park kultúry a oddychu started on 29 December 2015 and finished in the early 2016.

History 
Project for the buildings is from the years 1943-1948 by Pavol Andrik, Kamil A. Gross and Ján Štefanec. The buildings were originally built as administrative and exhibition buildings for the Danube fair which took place in the Port of Bratislava but was in need of new, larger premises.

Significance 
PKO was the main location in Bratislava for organizing dance class graduations ("venček") with ballroom (standard) dance classes being widely attended during the first half of high school in Slovakia, as well quite popular for organizing school proms ("stužková") and high-school freshmen parties ("imatrikulácie"). As a result, several generations had an emotional bond with the PKO premises.

PKO was also the premier location for performing several types of music in Slovakia.

Future 
An investor constructing a new planetarium, media library, square and the promenade with a pier on the site, in addition to flats and office spaces, which will be part of the River Park 2 project.

Gallery

See also 
 River Park

References 

Buildings and structures in Bratislava
Demolished buildings and structures in Slovakia
Buildings and structures demolished in 2016